The Faculty of Engineering & Applied Science is the faculty responsible for all students pursuing degrees in the various engineering disciplines at Queen's University at Kingston in Kingston, Ontario, Canada. Undergraduate students are represented by the Engineering Society.

Programs

The Faculty of Engineering & Applied Science offers the following programs:

 Dual Degrees (Students can opt to take an Art-Science program concurrent with their Engineering program, which usually requires an additional year of study)
 Mathematics & Engineering*
 Chemical Engineering
 Civil Engineering
 Computer Engineering
 Electrical Engineering
 Engineering Chemistry*
 Engineering Physics*
 Geological Engineering*
 Mechanical and Materials Engineering
 Mining Engineering
 Engineering and Co-op

All programs marked with * are Engineering Science programs.

Queen's Engineering students share a common first year program meaning they are not required to select a discipline until after they have completed their first year of studies.

History
In 1893, the Ontario government established the Kingston School of Mining, coinciding with the location of Queen's University at Kingston, but existing legally as a separate institution.  When Queen's became a secular institution in 1910, the School of Mining officially joined with the University and subsequently renamed itself the Faculty of Applied Science.

The first woman to graduate from the Faculty, in 1946, was Dorothy Snook (née Heartz), born in Montreal and a long time resident of Truro, Nova Scotia. In the twenty-first century, 31% of the Engineering Class of 2020 are women, one of the highest percentages of any major engineering program in the country.

In early 2010, the Faculty of Applied Science was re-branded, after a vote throughout the faculty, as the Faculty of Engineering & Applied Science.

Alumni
Dalton Kellett (B.Sc.(Eng.) 2015) A. J. Foyt Enterprises Racing driver
Donald Lindsay (B.Sc.(Eng.) 1980) -- CEO of Teck Resources Limited
Donald Charlesworth B.Sc.(Eng.) Nuclear scientist, Atomic Energy of Canada Ltd.
Mark Charlesworth B.Sc.(Eng.) (1981) Co-developer of CorelDraw software
Ian Rae B.Sc.(Eng.) (1980) Co-developer of CorelDraw software
Walter F Light B.Sc.(Eng.) (1949) Former CEO of Nortel
Faqir Chand Kohli (B.Sc.(Eng.) 1948) Former Director of Tata Consultancy Services, the "father of the Indian software industry"
Geoffrey Ballard (B.Sc.(Eng.) 1956) Hailed as "Master of Modern Technology" by CBC Newsworld
Gururaj Deshpande (PhD) Founder and Chairman of Sycamore Networks, Inc. and member of the MIT Corporation.
Alfred Bader B.Sc.(Eng.)(1945) Founder of the Sigma-Aldrich Corporation
Denzil Doyle (B.Sc.(Eng.) 1956) Founding President of Digital Equipment Corporation's subsidiary in Canada

Integrated Learning Centre

The Faculty of Engineering & Applied Science's newest building, the Integrated Learning Centre, was officially opened in June 2004 as Beamish–Munro Hall.  This facility designed to support and stimulate undergraduate learning includes multi-purpose rooms, shared teaching laboratories, prototyping workshop rooms, space for students to work on projects together, environmentally-sustainable features, "Live Building" systems through which the building itself can be used as a learning tool, and a three-storey-high living wall to act as a biofilter. Most of the rooms as well as laboratories can be used freely, and some of them can be booked. The Tea Room, a student-run café with objectives of environmental sustainability, opened in the Integrated Learning Centre in the fall of 2006.

Following concerns of high maintenance costs, the living wall was removed in 2015, to be replaced by a piece of artwork designed by Toronto-based artist Kwest in collaboration with engineering students.

Engineering traditions
Engineering students at Queen's are enrolled under the Faculty of Engineering & Applied Science.  Engineering student spirit is very evident through strong traditions.  One such tradition is the dyeing of themselves and their golden leather jackets (known as "Golden Party Armour" or GPA for short) purple with gentian violet (aka "purpling").  Full-body purpling is done by second-year students who are involved in frosh week facilitation, called "FRECs", an acronym derived from "Frosh Regulation Enforcement Committee", although the original term remains only as a historical note.  As a result of the ban on "purple people" in residences and cafeterias made in 1990 (due to the colour rubbing off), first-year students don't purple during frosh week, as the majority live in residence.  However, frosh are known to purple themselves during homecoming weekend on the Saturday morning preceding the football game.  The purpling of jackets by frosh is considered a rite of passage, performed two nights before their final exam of the fall term, immediately after getting their jackets and kicking them home. The jackets are literally kicked back to their residences or homes, as frosh cannot touch the jackets with their hands until they have been brought home. This has stemmed the tradition of upper years playing pranks on frosh, (e.g. throwing the jackets on roofs, tying them to a pole, etc., and having the frosh find ways to get back their jackets without using their hands).  The right to wear the jacket is not permitted until the final fall term exam has been completed. In addition, badges and crests, in particular the "Pass Crest" that goes on the sleeve, may not be added to the jacket until the completion of First Year exams. After the completion of First Year, in April, students may also sew on various "bars" to their jackets. Bars are earned and ordered for a variety of events and feats. There are many bars for accomplishments, for participating in activities, such as Thundersledz (a winter frosh group event), for signifying the countries they have the most affinity with, signifying the discipline they are in, etc.

In the Fall of 1956, the class of Science '60 was forced to climb a goalpost stolen the previous year from the University of Toronto's Varsity Stadium.  Over the years, this has evolved into the legendary Grease pole tradition, and led to some friendly rivalry with U of T. To this day, first-year students are led to "climb the greasepole", which is the same goalpost covered in  industrial lanolin, surrounded by a waist-deep pit of water, commonly known as "the greasepit."

Another Queen's Engineering tradition is an event called "Sci Formal" (Science Formal) in which fourth-year students spend thousands of man hours constructing and transforming the interior of Grant and Kingston Halls into storybook scenery that rivals movie sets for a one-night black tie event.  In past years, whole castles, churches, pyramids and a giant sphinx have been constructed inside Grant Hall.

Limitation on years of study

Students registered in the Bachelor of Applied Science (Engineering) program at Queen's University are required to complete the four-year degree in no more than six academic sessions. These six years are assessed as terms in which the student is actively registered. A student who has not completed the degree program in six years will normally be required to withdraw. An extension will normally be granted to students who have completed, or are working on an Internship, Exchange, or are enrolled in a Dual Degree program, or have received accommodation through the Queen's Disability Services office due to a disability. Requests for an extension are submitted to the Faculty Office and considered by the Operations Committee -Academic Progress.

Engineering Society

Formed in 1896, the Engineering Society of Queen's University, often known as EngSoc, is one of the oldest representative bodies for engineering students in Canada and continues to be a leader in student initiatives. With 2400 members currently staying on campus, fifteen thousand active alumni living throughout the world, and an annual budget of $1.2 million, the Engineering Society oversees some forty-five student-run initiatives ranging from design projects to services to fun social events.  The Engineering Society also publishes the weekly humour newspaper, Golden Words.

Clark Hall
Clark Hall was named after Arthur Lewis Clark, who was Dean of Applied Science for 24 years.  The building houses Clark Hall Pub, the Campus Bookstore and the old EngSoc Lounge (with the new EngSoc Lounge being in Beamish-Munro Hall), which in turn hosts several student-run services such as Queen's Project on International Development, Golden Words and Campus Equipment Outfitters (CEO).

Clark Hall Pub is a traditional hangout of engineering students at Queen's University, although it is frequented by students of all faculties.  It is run by the Queen's Engineering Society (EngSoc), and is located in Clark Hall, above the Campus Bookstore.  It was Canada's first completely student run pub.  First opened in 1971, Clark Hall Pub is the oldest pub on the Queen's campus.  In June 2007, Clark Hall Pub was closed indefinitely by the Engineering Society, citing concerns about management and financial clarity. Since then it has re-opened and resumed normal operations as of October 2008.

Clark Hall Pub has also been home to many successful acts, including The Tragically Hip, Arcade Fire, Arkells, Bedouin Soundclash, K-os, and Craig Cardiff. Every year a house band is chosen through a 'Battle of the Bands'-style competition,  which the Tragically Hip failed to win when they were first starting out in the 1980s.

Every Friday afternoon, students of all faculties line up outside the pub to attend "Ritual", the busiest day for the pub and long-standing faculty tradition.

See also
Queen's University Solar Vehicle Team
Queen's Engineering Society
Engineering traditions in Canada
Iron Ring
Women in Engineering

References

External links
Official Faculty of Engineering and Applied Science site
Engineering Society of Queen's University
Clark Hall Pub
History of Clark Hall and Biography of Arthur Lewis Clark
Campus Bookstore
Integrated Learning Centre

Faculty of Engineering and Applied Science
Engineering universities and colleges in Canada